John Williams Joseph "Bunny" Roser (November 15, 1901 – May 6, 1979) nicknamed "Jack", was a professional baseball player. He was an outfielder for one season (1923) with the Boston Braves. For his career, he compiled a .239 batting average in 113 at-bats, with 16 runs batted in.

He was born in St. Louis, Missouri and died in Rocky Hill, Connecticut at the age of 77.

External links

1901 births
1979 deaths
Boston Braves players
Major League Baseball outfielders
Baseball players from Missouri
Minor league baseball managers
St. Petersburg Saints players
Pittsfield Hillies players
Worcester Panthers players
Baltimore Orioles (IL) players
Williamsport Grays players
Birmingham Barons players
Bridgeport Bears (baseball) players
Hartford Senators players
Harrisburg Senators players
Norfolk Tars players
Richmond Byrds players
Gloversville-Johnstown Glovers players
People from Rocky Hill, Connecticut